Eugene Magee (born 1 April 1986) Ireland men's field hockey international. He was a member of the Ireland team that won the bronze medal at the 2015 Men's EuroHockey Nations Championship. He also represented Ireland at the 2016 Summer Olympics and at the 2018 Men's Hockey World Cup. At club level he has won Men's Irish Hockey League, Irish Senior Cup and Kirk Cup titles with Banbridge. He has also scored for three clubs – HGC, KHC Dragons and Banbridge – in the Euro Hockey League.

Early years, family and education
Magee's hometown is Ballela in County Down. He completed his elementary education at All Saints Ballela. In his youth Magee initially played hurling, representing Down/South Down at minor level. He continued to play hurling occasionally for Ballela, even after deciding to concentrate on field hockey. He played in two Down Junior Hurling Championship finals for Ballela. In 2008 he scored four goals when helping Ballela lift the Down title with a win over Clonduff. In 2015 he scored a point in their extra-time victory over Newry Shamrocks. Between 1997 and 2004 Magee attended Banbridge Academy where he first began to play field hockey. In a 2015 interview with The Irish News, Magee stated, "I quickly discovered that many of the hurling skills were easily transferable and I became quite good at hockey." Between 2004 and 2009 he attended Ulster University where he gained a BSc in Quantity Surveying. Between 2013 and 2014 he attended Queen's University Belfast where he gained a master's degree in Software Development. Magee's brother, Owen Magee, has also played field hockey for both Banbridge and Ireland and hurling for Ballela.

Domestic teams

Banbridge
Magee began his senior career with Banbridge. While playing for Banbridge, he also represented Ulster at interprovincial level and Ulster Elks at intervarsity level. After brief spells playing professionally with HGC and Adelaide Hotshots, in 2009 Magee left Banbridge for KHC Dragons. After four seasons away, Magee re-joined Banbridge in 2013. In 2014 he helped Banbridge win the Eurohockey Champions Challenge I.
In 2014–15 he captained Banbridge as they won both the Kirk Cup and the Irish Senior Cup. In 2016 he was a member of the Banbridge team that finished as runners up to Lisnagarvey in the EY Champions Trophy. In 2016–17 he a member of the Banbridge team that won a national double, winning both the Irish Senior Cup and the Men's Irish Hockey League. He scored twice in the Irish Senior Cup final as Banbridge defeated Monkstown 3–1. He also represented Banbridge in the 2016–17 Euro Hockey League.

HGC
In 2007 Magee played for HGC in the Hoofdklasse and the 2007–08 Euro Hockey League. His teammates at HGC included Iain Lewers, John Jermyn, Barry Middleton and Bram Lomans.

Adelaide Hotshots
In March 2008, following the 2008 Men's Field Hockey Olympic Qualifier, Magee played for Adelaide Hotshots in the Australian Hockey League.

KHC Dragons
Between 2009 and 2012 Magee played for KHC Dragons in the Men's Belgian Hockey League. He helped Dragons win national league titles and represented them in the 2010–11 and 2011–12 Euro Hockey Leagues. He helped them finish third in the 2011–12 competition.

Crefelder HTC
Magee spent the 2012–13 season playing for Crefelder HTC in the Bundesliga. His teammates at Crefelder HTC included Ronan Gormley.

Ireland international
Magee made his senior debut for Ireland in 2005 against Belgium. He was a member of the Ireland teams that won the 2009 Men's EuroHockey Nations Trophy and the 2011 Men's Hockey Champions Challenge II. Magee also helped Ireland win Men's FIH Hockey World League tournaments in 2012, 2015 and 2017. In May 2015 Magee made his 200th senior appearance for Ireland in a game against France. After Ronan Gormley, he became the second Ireland men's international to reach the 200 mark. Gormley reached his double century earlier in May 2015. He was a member of the Ireland team that won the bronze medal at the 2015 Men's EuroHockey Nations Championship. He also represented Ireland at the 2016 Summer Olympics and at the 2018 Men's Hockey World Cup. In June 2017 Magee was a member of the Ireland team that won the Hamburg Masters, defeating Germany 4–2 in the final. He retired from international hockey after Ireland failed to qualify for the 2020 Summer Olympics.

Employment
Magee has worked as a quantity surveyor and as a software engineer.

Honours
Ireland
Hamburg Masters
Winners: 2017 
Men's FIH Hockey World League Round 1
Winners: 2012 Cardiff
Men's FIH Hockey World League Round 2
Winners: 2015 San Diego, 2017 Belfast
Runners up: 2013 New Delhi
Men's FIH Series Finals
Runners up: 2019 Le Touquet
Men's Hockey Champions Challenge II
Winners: 2011
Runners up: 2009
Men's EuroHockey Nations Trophy
Winners: 2009
Men's Field Hockey Olympic Qualifier
Runners up: 2012
Men's Hockey Investec Cup
Runners up: 2014
Banbridge
Eurohockey Champions Challenge I
Winners: 2014: 1 
Men's Irish Hockey League
Winners: 2016–17 : 1
Irish Senior Cup
Winners: 2014–15, 2016–17: 2
Kirk Cup
Winners: 2014–15: 1
EY Champions Trophy
Runners-up: 2016: 1
KHC Dragons
Belgium Hockey League
Winners: 2009–10, 2010–11: 2

References

External links
 
 
 

1986 births
Living people
Ireland international men's field hockey players
Male field hockey players from Northern Ireland
Irish male field hockey players
British male field hockey players
Olympic field hockey players of Ireland
Field hockey players at the 2016 Summer Olympics
2018 Men's Hockey World Cup players
KHC Dragons players
HGC players
Men's Irish Hockey League players
Men's Hoofdklasse Hockey players
Expatriate field hockey players
Male field hockey midfielders
Male field hockey forwards
Down hurlers
Sportspeople from County Down
Irish expatriate sportspeople in Belgium
Expatriate sportspeople from Northern Ireland in the Netherlands
Expatriate sportspeople from Northern Ireland in Australia
Expatriate sportspeople from Northern Ireland in Germany
People educated at Banbridge Academy
Alumni of Ulster University
Alumni of Queen's University Belfast
Software engineers
Quantity surveyors
Men's Belgian Hockey League players